Osmani Nagar is an upazila of Sylhet District in the Division of Sylhet, Bangladesh.

Etymology
“Osmani Nagar” is a compound of two words, Osmani and nagar (city), which literally means “the city of Osmani”. Osmani Nagar was named in honour of General Muhammad Ataul Gani Osmani, the commander-in-chief of Mukti Bahini during Bangladesh Liberation War in 1971.

History
Osmani Nagar was previously part of historic Aurangapur Pargana. Following the Conquest of Sylhet in 1303, Shah Jalal instructed his disciples to spread out and propagate Islam. Five pirs, among whom Shah Gabru is most well-known, set up a hujra south of Banaiya Haor in a Hindu village. Many Hindu families embraced Islam due to their efforts and Gabru eventually married into one of the families and the village was named after him as Gabhurteki. Other disciples of Shah Jalal that contributed to the spread of Islam in present-day Osmani Nagar include Nizamuddin Osmani in Dayamir, Shah Sulayman Karani Qurayshi in Karanshi and Shah Jalaluddin in Khushkipur (Korua). The tombs of Shah Siddiq, Shah Garib and Usman Baghdadi can be found in Osmanpur Union. Similarly, Shah Mustafa also passed by the village of Tilapara (in Mukhtarpur, Burunga Union) with a group of Muslims on the way to Chandrapur (modern-day Moulvibazar). They rested under a large tree near a pond situated in the home of a Hindu family of Brahmins (priests). It was customary for this family to give offerings under the tree everyday for their Devatas satisfaction. According to tradition, the priest and his wife had dreamed of the Devata going away and when the family refused to let it go, they said the truth has come, we have no right to stay. Waking up from the dream, they went towards the tree and saw three respectful men. The Brahmin priest had a friendly discussion with them, and accepted Islam. The news of his conversion spread across the area and many more people converted to Islam on that day. On the evening of Mustafa's departure, he entrusted the new converts to one of his murids (disciples).

Shah Tajuddin, a companion of Shah Kamal Quhafah, migrated to village of Gauharpur after arriving in Sylhet in 1315 CE.

Osmani Nagar thana was established with eight Union Parishads of Balaganj on 23 March 2001. On 2 June 2014, the thana was turned into an upazila.

Osmani Nagar is famous for providing fierce fighters during the Bangladesh Liberation War, 1971, with General Osmani being a notable figure.First Upazilla Nirbhahi Officer:'
First Upazilla Nirbhahi Officer was Mr. Mohammad Showkat Ali. He joined at Osmaninagar Upazilla as the first Upazilla Nirbhahi Officer on 13 July 2015.

Geography

Economy

Demography

Administration
Osmani Nagar Upazila is divided into eight union parishads: Burungabazar, Dayamir, Goalabazar, Osmanpur, Sadipur, Tajpur, Umarpur, and West Poilanpur. The union parishads are subdivided into 129 mauzas and 295 villages.

Education
 Tajpur Degree College
Goala Bazar Adarsha Mahila College
Dayamir Degree College
Osmaninagar Islamic Academy
Mangal Chandi Nishi Kanta Govt. High School.(M.C.N.K)

Notable people
 Mufleh R. Osmany, former Foreign Secretary and diplomat
 Muhammad Ashraf Ali, member of parliament
 Muhammad Ataul Gani Osmani, commander-in-chief of Mukti Bahini
 Shah Azizur Rahman, politician
 Shah Gabru, early disciple of Shah Jalal who took part in the 14th-century Conquest of Sylhet
 Shah Tajuddin, late disciple of Shah Jalal

See also
Upazilas of Bangladesh
Districts of Bangladesh
Divisions of Bangladesh

References